The PEI Tankard is the Prince Edward Island provincial championship for men's curling. The tournament is run by Curl PEI, the provincial curling association. The winner represents Team Prince Edward Island at the Tim Hortons Brier.

Prince Edward Island has had a team in the Brier since 1936.

Past champions

References
List of winners 

The Brier provincial tournaments
Curling competitions in Prince Edward Island
1930s establishments in Prince Edward Island